Pere Monistrol (August 16, 1894 – May 2, 1972) was a Catalan photographer and footballer of the 1910s. Born in Sabadell, Catalonia, he was a highly regarded professional photographer in Sabadell, who in 1948 achieved remarkable success at the International Exhibition of Pictorial Photography in Dublin. In addition, he was one of the first great players of the Sabadell FC, where he played between 1909 and 1919. He was a member of the team that was proclaimed champion of Catalonia in the 1919–20 season. He also played for the Catalan national team between 1915 and 1919.

References

Footballers from Catalonia
Spanish photographers
1894 births
1972 deaths
Spanish footballers
Catalonia international footballers